The Moldavian Bull's Heads (lit. "aurochs' head") are the first Romanian postage stamps, sold by Moldavia from July to October 1858. Released in four values, these stamps are renowned for their rarity. The second and third Romanian issues also feature the head of the aurochs, symbol of Moldavia—the former on its own and the latter, printed after the Union of the Principalities, alongside a representation of Wallachia.

First issue

Following the 1856 Treaty of Paris, the Danubian Principalities of Moldavia and Wallachia took a number of modernizing measures, including postal reform. Their leaders were aware of the appearance of postage stamps, starting in the United Kingdom in 1840. In Moldavia, caimacam Nicolae Vogoride and his council named a postal committee and directorate as well as hiring trained personnel from Austria. The postal headquarters was set up in a 14-room building in Iaşi, and price regulations were issued on June 30 and July 6, 1858. A letter traveling up to eight post offices cost 27 para (57 bani), and one going more than eight cost 54 para (1.14 lei). Short-distance registered letters were 81 para (2 lei) and long-distance ones cost 108 para (2.28 lei). From Iaşi, one could send a regular letter for 27 para to Bacău, Botoşani, Dorohoi, Fălticeni, Huşi, Mihăileni, Piatra Neamţ, Roman, Târgu Ocna, Târgu Neamţ and Vaslui. (Mihăileni was farther than eight post offices, but received a lower rate since it was a border crossing point.) The higher rate was charged when sending to Adjud, Bârlad, Bolgrad, Cahul, Focşani, Galaţi, Ismail and Tecuci. Letters bearing the stamps could only circulate within Moldavia. The charges were valid until October 31, 1858, with a new stamp series and a single charge introduced the following day.

Starting on July 1, 1858, letters without stamps were placed in mailboxes placed in public squares and at the postal headquarters in Iaşi, while in other towns such letters were handed over at the post office. Payment would then be made by the recipient. Although the rates went into effect on July 1, it seems the stamps were not placed into circulation until July 15. Their printing was approved May 26, and four steel dies costing 389 lei had been produced by July 1, the engraver unknown. The stamp sheets were printed one by one with the aid of a manual press; in all, 24,064 stamps were printed. Unlike many stamps of the period, which featured the ruling head of state, Moldavia's had the ancient coat of arms with the head of an aurochs. There is a five-pointed star between the horns. The aurochs' lower lip rests on a post horn, within the inner tube of which is the stamp's value in Arabic numerals. The horn and head are enclosed in a circle. Around this circle, in the interior above the head, are the Romanian Cyrillic letters ПОРТО СКРИСОРИ (PORTO SCRISORI; "letters to be paid for by the recipient"). The use of the word PORTO is a mistake; FRANCO denotes letters where the postage has been paid by the sender, as was the case for letters using these stamps.

Aside from the economic advantage derived from simplifying communications, the stamps and the symbol they used were a political statement against the Ottoman Empire that still exercised suzerainty over the principality. The Ottomans themselves would not issue a stamp until 1863. Indeed, they are the first stamps from Southeast Europe, with Greece issuing its first in 1861, Serbia in 1866 and Bulgaria in 1879. Earlier attempts to introduce a national coin or seal had been denied by Turkey, but the stamp, Moldavia's first exercise of autonomous statehood, was allowed because the relevant imperial authorities there were not yet familiar with the notion.

The paper used to print the stamps came from Bath, Somerset, imported by an Iaşi merchant and bought by the Finance Ministry. (According to another variant, the project was undertaken in haste, and leaves of paper were bought from an Iaşi bookstore.) Each sheet had 32 stamps, with four rows of eight, and the middle rows included eight tête-bêche pairs. The 27 para were done in black ink; the rest in blue. The sheets were tinted rose (27 para), greenish (54 para), bluish (81 para) and light rose (108 para). The paper was horizontally lined, except for the 81 para, which was ordinary paper. The sheets were gummed manually with a brush using gum arabic. The stamps were imperforate, cut with scissors at the post office. Because of this, individual stamps have significant size differences between them. Also, due to the manual printing, the rows of stamps were not properly aligned on the sheets.

Stamps were cancelled with a double circle featuring the name of the post office above and the word Moldova below, in capital letters. In the middle, in fractional form, were the date and month in Arabic numerals. The rubber stamps were ordered from Vienna.

The first 187 sheets of 32 (5,984 stamps) were sent from the press to the treasury on July 11, 1858. These were sent to the post office headquarters the following day, receipt confirmed on July 14. Headquarters decided not to send the stamps to other post offices until the full stock was received. The remaining 18,080 stamps had arrived by July 21, when the first stamps were sent to the main post office in Iaşi. In August, stamps were sent to Bacău, Bârlad, Botoşani, Dorohoi, Fălticeni, Focşani, Galaţi, Roman, Tecuci, Târgu Neamţ, Vaslui and Mihăileni. The earliest letters featuring the stamps date to July 22; the latest, to October 31.

Second and third issues

The second series had three stamps: 5 para, 40 para (1 leu) and 80 para (2 lei). Regular letters cost 40 para, registered mail 80 para, simple newspapers 5 para and double newspapers 10 para. On these stamps, the head and horn were surrounded by a rectangle with rounded corners, and the inscription (PORTO GAZETEI for the 5 para and PORTO SCRISOREI for the 40 and 80 para) was in Latin characters, while "parale" was in Cyrillic. Printing figures are as follows:

These stamps circulated in Moldavia, and very rarely in Wallachia after the Union of the Principalities on January 24, 1859. They were withdrawn on May 1, 1862, although four stamps were cancelled on May 3 in Botoşani, official use having been extended on request until May 5.

The third series of Romanian stamps, issued under the auspices of the United Principalities, was valid between May 1, 1862 and December 31, 1864. It featured the aurochs' head as well as the Wallachian vulture, replaced PORTO with FRANCO, and used only Latin letters. It appeared in values of 3, 6 and 30 para, in two series (1862 and 1864). Printed in Bucharest, a delay meant the stamps were not placed in circulation until May 26. The second series were sold from September 13, 1864 until the end of the year.

Scarcity and legacy
Printing figures for the first issue are as follows: 6,016 of the 27 para; 10,016 of the 54 para; 2,016 of the 81 para and 6,016 of the 108 para. By the end of October, when they were withdrawn, 11,756 of 24,064 had been sold. The remaining 12,308 stamps were deposited at the headquarters. Later, following Moldavia's union with Wallachia and the creation of a single postal service, they were moved to the old central post office on Strada Doamnei in Bucharest (now the site of the Stock Market Palace). The stock was destroyed in a devastating fire in 1874.

A 1994 study (giving slightly different figures for the number of stamps sold and withdrawn) of stamps still extant found the following:

A 2009 investigation of the National Philatelic Museum's holdings revealed that 215 stamps of the first series and 660 of the second and third had been replaced by suspected forgeries. A German expert certified they were forged, although the museum responded that he had only analyzed three stamps directly, with the rest of his decision based on scans, and that the authenticity remains uncertain. Their total value was variously estimated at €3.15 million or €60 million.

The stamps were reprinted several times, and also forged in Romania and abroad. Captain Costică Moroiu was one of these forgers. In 1881, the same year he founded the Romanian Philatelic Society, he created 1858-design stamps with values of 15, 45, 90 and 135 para. In 1883, stationed at Mangalia, he sold stamps with his own design at a brisk pace, evading punishment. In 1889, prosecutors entered the press of Universul newspaper, where they found dies for and thousands of copies of Bull's Head stamps. Arrested and sent to Văcăreşti prison, he attempted suicide. Moroiu was released for lack of evidence, having argued that all his customers knew the stamps were forgeries.

The stamps have been admired at various expositions, including at what is now Sala Dalles in 1932 for their 75th anniversary, and at the Postal Palace in 1958 for their centenary. The original dies survive and are on display at the philatelic museum.

Vasile Voiculescu's 1947 short story Capul de zimbru and Lucian Pintilie's 2006 film Tertium non datur both feature the Bull's Head stamp as one of their themes.

An authentic Bull's Head stamp was worth between €5,000 and €100,000 by 2010. Just two copies of the 81 para survive in mint never-hinged, original gum condition, estimated at €70,000 to €100,000. In 2006, a November 11, 1858 edition of Zimbrul şi Vulturul featuring eight 5-para stamps from the second series became the most expensive newspaper copy ever sold at auction.

References and sources
Notes

Sources
 Ştefan Nicolau, Poşta şi filateliştii botoşăneni, Editura Axa, Botoşani, 2007.

External links

The Moldavian “Bulls Head” Classics 

Philately of Romania
1858 establishments in Europe
1858 establishments in the Ottoman Empire
19th-century establishments in Moldavia